John Arthur Hauger (November 18, 1893 – August 2, 1944) was a major league baseball player and scout and minor league manager.

Hauger was an outfielder for the  Cleveland Naps. He played in fifteen games and only managed one hit (a single) in eighteen at bats for a .056 career batting average.

He did have a long minor league career and saw some time as a minor league manager including a stint as the skipper of the Virginia League Kinston Eagles.

Later, Hauger worked for Western Pipe and Steel while working part-time as a scout for the Chicago White Sox until he died from a heart attack in 1944. He served in the Coast Guard Reserve during World War II.

References

External links

1893 births
1944 deaths
Cleveland Naps players
Major League Baseball outfielders
United States Coast Guard personnel of World War II
Baseball players from Ohio
Minor league baseball managers
People from Hamilton County, Ohio
American people of Norwegian descent
Toledo Mud Hens players
New Castle Nocks players
Sharon Travelers players
Waterbury Contenders players
Evansville River Rats players
Evansville Evas players
Topeka Kaw-nees players
Hutchinson Salt Packers players
Oklahoma City Indians players
Salt Lake City Bees players
Edmonton Elks players
Chattanooga Lookouts players
Spartanburg Spartans players
Bay City Wolves players
Kinston Eagles players
Winston-Salem Twins players
Bentonville Mustangs players
United States Coast Guard reservists
Pennington Gap Miners players
Williamston Martins players
Jackson Convicts players